SmartDisk may refer to:

SmartDisk (company), now SMDK Corporation, known for its FlashPath products
NetVault: SmartDisk, a backup software product  
Verbatim SmartDisk Portable Hard Drive